Rajballavpur High School  is a public higher secondary school in Maslandapur, West Bengal. The institution is sponsored by the Government of West Bengal.

About School
Rajballavpur High School is one of the largest Govt. sponsored higher secondary educational institutions in West Bengal. Often the school is abbreviated informally as RHS. The school was established on 2 January 1954 in the village of Rajballavpur-Maslandapur in the district of 24 parganas (now in North 24 parganas), nearly 1 km from Maslandapur railway station. This is a co-educational institution (V to X is only for Boys). The school is a four storied building having a large green playground in front of it and the school offers classes in Pure Science, Arts and Commerce in Class 11 and 12. Apart from the regular education, the school provides with the vocational education as well at the Higher Secondary level.

See also
Education in India
List of schools in India
Education in West Bengal

References

External links
 
 School's address and contact details http://www.schosys.com/institutes/35464/Rajballavpur-High-School

Schools in North 24 Parganas district
Educational institutions established in 1954
1954 establishments in West Bengal